No.1 High School Affiliated to East China Normal University  moved to a new campus in August 2005. Each year, many graduates attend Tsinghua University, Peking University, Shanghai Jiao Tong University, East China Normal University and other prestigious universities.

History

High School Affiliated to Kwang Hua University, established on June 3, 1926 and High School Affiliated to the Great China University, established in Fall, 1925 merged to form High School Affiliated to East China Normal University on September 7, 1951.

Sister school
The school has a sister school, No. 2 High School Attached to East China Normal University.

Alumni
Zhou Youguang 周有光, a Chinese linguist graduated from Guanghua university
Qiao Shi 乔石 a politician in the People's Republic of China, former Chairman of the Standing Committee of the National People's Congress
Yao Yilin 姚依林 deputy Vice Premier of the State Council of the People's Republic of China from 1983 to 1988 
Wei Jianxing 尉健行 a politician in the People's Republic of China, former member of The Political Bureau of the Central Committee
Xie Jin 谢晋 an important Chinese film director
Zheng Kelu 郑克鲁, a professor and translator of French literature

References

External links
No. 1 High School Affiliated to East China Normal University website
Alumni Association (校友会)

High schools in Shanghai
East China Normal University
East China Normal University
Educational institutions established in 1951
1951 establishments in China